Bledsoe is an unincorporated community in western Cochran County, Texas, located near the New Mexico border. It is about 68 miles west of Lubbock, Texas. As of the 1990 US Census, the town had a population of 125.

History 
Bledsoe was founded in 1925 as the terminus of the Panhandle and Santa Fe Railway, and named for Samuel T. Bledsoe, the line's president. The town gained its original prosperity through its function as a cattle-shipping station, and reached its greatest population of 400 in 1930. The Great Depression had dire effect on the community and throughout the remainder of the 20th century the population continued to dwindle; the last recorded figure put the 1990 population at 125.

Education 
It is within the Whiteface Consolidated Independent School District. The former Bledsoe Independent School District merged into Whiteface CISD on July 1, 1996.

See also
KZJW-LD

References

Unincorporated communities in Cochran County, Texas
Unincorporated communities in Texas
Populated places established in 1925
1925 establishments in Texas